The 2019 Mississippi Valley State Delta Devils football team represents Mississippi Valley State University in the 2019 NCAA Division I FCS football season. The Delta Devils are led by second-year head coach Vincent Dancy and play their home games at Rice–Totten Stadium as members of the East Division of the Southwestern Athletic Conference (SWAC).

Previous season
The Delta Devils finished the 2018 season 1–10, 1–6 in SWAC play to finish in last place in the East Division.

Preseason

Preseason polls
The SWAC released their preseason poll on July 16, 2019. The Delta Devils were picked to finish in fifth place in the East Division.

Preseason all-SWAC teams
The Delta Devils did not place any players on the preseason all-SWAC teams.

Schedule

Game summaries

at Tennessee State

at Lamar

Bethune–Cookman

at Alcorn State

Virginia–Lynchburg

at Arkansas–Pine Bluff

Jackson State

Texas Southern

Alabama State

Grambling State

at Alabama A&M

References

Mississippi Valley State
Mississippi Valley State Delta Devils football seasons
Mississippi Valley State Delta Devils football